

Events
Al Capone's Chicago Outfit earns a yearly income of $108 million ($ billion today).
Salvatore Maranzano is sent to New York by Sicilian Mafia Don Vito Cascio Ferro in an attempt to unify the New York Italian-American gangs into a single organization.
South Carolina bootlegger Manley Sullivan becomes the first gangster to be convicted for federal tax evasion. The case would establish the precedent of illegal income being taxable, an effective weapon against organized crime figures throughout the decade.
The Southside O'Donnell's gang kidnaps John "Jackie" Adler, a liaison for Al Capone to the Chicago police. Adler is later released unharmed.
Angelo Lo Mantio, a Milwaukee, Wisconsin gunman, is hired by Chicago bootlegger and organized crime leader Joe Aiello to murder competitor Al Capone.
Joe Aiello continues hiring gunmen to kill rival Al Capone, but hitmen Sam Valante and New York gangster Antonio Torchio, in separate incidents, are both killed by members of Capone's Chicago Outfit as they each disembark their trains in Chicago.
Sydney, Australia, gangster Norman Bruhn is killed on the orders of John "Snowy" Cutmore, leader of the Fitzroy razor gang.
January – Chicago saloon owner John Costanaro, a distributor for the Sheldon Gang, is killed by a rival bootlegging gang.
January 6 – Theodore Anton, a restaurant manager above Al Capone's Hawthorne Inn, is kidnapped and later killed by the rival North Side Gang.
March 11 – Saltis-McErlane gunmen Charles "Big Hayes" Hubacek and Frank "Lefty" Koncil are killed, possibly by Chicago Outfit gunmen in retaliation for Koncil's recent acquittal for the 1926 murder of Sheldon Gang member John "Mitters" Foley.
March 28 – Joseph Amato, boss of the Milwaukee crime family, dies of natural causes and is succeeded by Joseph Vallone.
April 4 – North Side Gang leader Vincent Drucci is killed by Chicago Police detective Dan Healy while in police custody.
June 10 – While checking up on Frankie Yale's bootlegging operations in New York, Capone gunman James DeAmato is killed in Manhattan.
July 24 – Charles Birger is sentenced to death for the murder of West City Mayor Joseph Adams. Ray Hyland, a gunman for Birger, and Birger associate Arthur Newman are sentenced to life imprisonment.
August 7 – After being stopped by a US Coast Guard cutter off the eastern coast of Florida, "King of the Rum Runners" James Alderman kills a US Secret Service agent and two members of the Coast Guard while being arrested. Alderman is later convicted of murder and hanged in 1929.
October 13 – Joseph "Big Joe" Lonardo, founder and boss of the Cleveland crime family, is killed in a local barber shop, along with his brother John. Family underboss Salvatore Todaro, who planned the killings with the large Porrello brothers faction (owners of the barber shop), becomes the new boss.
October 16 – New York labor union racketeer Jacob Orgen is killed by Louis Buchalter and Jacob Shapiro. Orgen's bodyguard Jack Diamond is severely wounded but survives. 
October 26 – A shootout between rival Australian razor gang leaders Joseph 'Squizzy' Taylor of Melbourne and John "Snowy" Cutmore of Sydney results in the deaths of both men (Taylor succumbed on the 27th).

Arts and literature
Josef von Sternberg's Underworld is released starring George Bancroft, Evelyn Brent, Clive Brook, Fred Kohler and Helen Lynch.

Births
 James LaPietra, Chicago Outfit member
 January 2 – Vincent Meli, Detroit Partnership boss
 March 16 – Joseph Ferriola (Joe Nagall), Chicago Outfit member
 March 29 – Michael Rizzitello, Los Angeles crime family captain
 April 30 – Christopher "Christie Tick" Furnari, Lucchese crime family consiglieri
 November 13 – George Cornell, Richardson Gang member
 December 26 – Louis R. Failla, Patriarca crime family soldier

Deaths
Norman Bruhn, Sydney gangster
Sam Valante, member of Joe Aiello's gang
January – John Costanaro, Chicago saloon owner and associate of the Sheldon Gang
January 6 – Theodore Anton, Chicago Outfit associate
April 4 – Vincent Drucci, North Side Gang member
March 11 – Charles "Big Hayes" Hubacek, Saltis-McErlane gunman
March 11 – Frank "Lefty" Koncil, Saltis-McErlane gunman
March 28 – Joseph Amato, boss of Milwaukee crime family
June 10 – James DeAmato, Chicago Outfit gunman
October 13 – Joseph Lonardo, founder and boss of Cleveland crime family
October 13 – John Lonardo, brother of Joseph Lonardo
October 16 – Jacob Orgen, New York labor union racketeer
October 26 – John "Snowy" Cutmore, Sydney gangster 
October 27 – Joseph "Squizzy" Taylor, Melbourne gangster

Organized crime
Years in organized crime